Lake Serre-Ponçon (Vivaro-Alpine: Lac de Sèrra Ponçon) is a reservoir in the departments of Hautes-Alpes and Alpes-de-Haute-Provence, Provence-Alpes-Côte d'Azur region, in southeast France, one of the largest in Western Europe. The lake gathers the waters of the Durance and the Ubaye rivers, flowing down through the Hautes-Alpes and the Alpes du Sud to the Rhône.

History

The lake was created to control water flow after disastrous floods caused severe damage and loss of life in 1843 and 1856. First proposed in 1895,  construction started in 1955 and was completed by 1961.

The dam was constructed and the valley slowly became a lake, flooding some villages in the process. This flooding is the subject of Jean Giono's movie Girl and the River (1958), starring Guy Béart.

According to the official website of the Muséoscope, the "museum of the largest dam in Europe made of compacted soil", Lac de Serre-Ponçon includes a hydroelectric power plant with a 380 MW generator. In addition to the power plant on the lake itself, the dam provides the reservoir and overall water management to facilitate an additional 15 hydroelectric plants along the Durance and Verdon rivers in south-eastern France, with total capacity of 2,000 MW.

Within the lake is a small chapel, Chapelle Saint-Michel, which was originally built on a hill in the 12th century, destroyed by the army of Victor Amadeus II, Duke of Savoy in 1692, and rebuilt soon after. The chapel was originally condemned during the construction of the dam and lake, but survived, its hill becoming an island in the lake. The island is accessible on foot during winter and early spring as the lake is emptier at this period

Geography
Neighboring communes:
 Embrun
 Savines-le-Lac
 Chorges

References

French Department of Industry

External links
 
 Local Travel Guide for holidays at Serre-Ponçon

Serre Poncon
Serre Poncon
Serre Poncon
Serre-Poncon